Somnath Sigdel ( or ; 1884–1972; also known as Somnath Sigdyal) was a Nepalese renowned scholar and author.

Biography 
Somnath Sigdel was born on 5 October 1884 to Jagannath Sigdel in Nepal. His father was a Pandit of Vyākaraṇa , Dharmaśāstra and Jyotisa. He studied at Ranipokhari Sanskrit Pathashala in Kathmandu and later he moved to Banaras where he got a degree from Queens College Benares. Sigdel also served as principal of Valmiki Sanskrit College in Kathmandu. Later he was made a member of Nepal Academy. 

From 1906, he started to published poems in the magazine Sundari from Banaras. In 1920, He published Madhya Chandrikā (lit. Middle grammar). His Aadarsha Raghav (1948) is regarded as the modern Nepali version of Ramayana. Sigdel's poems were written in the style of Motiram Bhatta. His comic Digambar Bibaha is one of the earliest kind published in Nepal. 

He was given the title of Pandit Raj (Master Scholar) by King Mahendra. Sigdel died in 1972. In 1973, the Government of Nepal issued postage stamps featuring Sigdel. He was awarded Tribhuvan Pragya Award for his contributions to language, literature, culture, and Order of Gorkha Dakshina Bahu.

Works 

 Madhya Chandrikā (1920)
 Aadarsha Raghav (1948)
 Digambar Bibaha
 Suktisindhu
 Shakti Ballabh
 Laghu Chandrika

Awards 

 Nepal Academy's Tribhuvan Pragya Award.
 Order of Gorkha Dakshina Bahu

References 

1884 births
1972 deaths
19th-century Nepalese poets
20th-century Nepalese poets
Nepalese educators
Nepalese male poets
Nepali-language writers
People from Kathmandu District
Translators to Nepali
Nepalese Hindus
Nepali-language writers from Nepal